Birds Like Us is a 2017 computer animated film directed by Faruk Šabanović and Amela Ćuhara. The film is an animated free adaption of the Attar of Nishapur poem, "The Conference of the Birds". It features the Peter Gabriel song "Everybird", which was composed for the film and also appears on the album "Rated PG".

Cast
Alicia Vikander: Huppu / Mi
Jeremy Irons: Kondor
Jim Broadbent: Horozovich
Sheridan Smith: Gavra
Kevin Bishop: Hassan
Christopher Villiers: Craven
Michele Austin: Jula
Khalid Abdalla: Bat
Ella Smith: Tifa

Critical reception
Writing for Screen Daily, critic Wendy Ide reported that the film "eschews the source material’s delicate layering of symbolic allusion in favour of a baffling assault of visual non-sequiturs," and that "thanks to the esoteric plotting and disorientating animation, clarity is missing in action." A review on Dove.org described the film as not "look[ing] like your garden-variety animated film" and that "It’s occasionally funny [and] eventually hopeful."

References

External links
 

2017 animated films
2017 computer-animated films
2017 films
Animated films about birds
Bosnia and Herzegovina animated films
2010s English-language films